The 2008–09 Siena Saints men's basketball team represented Siena College in the 2007–08 college basketball season. This was head coach Fran McCaffery's fourth season at Siena. The Saints competed in the Metro Atlantic Athletic Conference and played their home games at Times Union Center. They finished the season 27–8, 16–2 in MAAC play to capture the regular season championship. They also won the 2009 MAAC men's basketball tournament for the second consecutive season to earn the conference's automatic bid to the NCAA tournament as No. 9 seed in the Midwest Region. After an opening round win over No. 8 seed Ohio State, the Saints lost to No. 1 seed Villanova in the second round.

Roster

Schedule and results
Source
All times are Eastern

|-
!colspan=9 style=| Regular season

|-
!colspan=10 style=| MAAC tournament

|-
!colspan=10 style=| NCAA tournament

Awards and honors
Kenny Hasbrouck – MAAC Player of the Year
Fran McCaffery – MAAC Men's Coach of the Year

References

Siena
Siena Saints men's basketball seasons
Siena
Siena Saints men's basketball
Siena Saints men's basketball